The Râul Negru (literally meaning "Black River") is a left tributary of the river Olt in Romania. It discharges into the Olt in Lunca Câlnicului. It flows through the villages Lemnia, Lunga, Catalina, Hătuica, Surcea, Telechia, Bita, Reci, Sântionlunca, Ozun, Băcel, Chichiș and Lunca Câlnicului.

Tributaries

The following rivers are tributaries to the Râul Negru (from source to mouth):

Left: Pârâul Mare, Brețcu, Stânca Uriașului, Capolna, Ojdula, Pârâul Racilor, Ghelința, Borviz, Zăbala, Fundul Pârâului, Covasna, Pârâul Beldii, Lisnău, Pârâul Satului, Tărlung
Right: Lemnia, Estelnic, Cașin, Mărtineni, Mărcușa, Dalnic, Pădureni, Reci, Angheluș

References

 
Rivers of Romania
Rivers of Covasna County
Rivers of Brașov County